Caryocolum huebneri is a moth of the family Gelechiidae. It is found in most of Europe, except Ireland, the Netherlands, the Iberian Peninsula, Norway, Finland, Estonia, Lithuania and most of the Balkan Peninsula. In the east, the range extends to the Ural Mountains.

The wingspan is 9–12 mm. The forewings are whitish, densely mottled with mid-brown, light brown and orange-brown. Adults have been recorded on wing from mid-July to late August.

The larvae feed on the shoots of Stellaria holostea. They live between shoots spun together with silk. Larvae can be found in May.

References

External links
lepiforum.de

Moths described in 1829
huebneri
Moths of Europe